Robert Schwarz may refer to:

Robert Schwarz Strauss (1918-2014), American politician
Robert Schwarz (translator) (1932–2003), Albanian translator also known as Robert Shvarc
Bob Schwarz, American television director
K. Robert Schwarz (1957–1999), American freelance music journalist on Radio Rewrite

See also
Robert Schwartz (disambiguation)